Abdel-Zaher El-Saqqa Ahmed Mohamed Hassan (born 30 January 1974) is an Egyptian retired footballer. He also won 112 caps for the Egypt national side, scoring 4 goals.

Beginning his career in Egypt with El Mansoura, El-Saka has also played in Turkey with Denizlispor, Gençlerbirliği, Konyaspor and Eskişehirspor.

He has Turkish citizenship with the name Abdel Zaher El Saka.

Career statistics

International goals

See also
 List of men's footballers with 100 or more international caps

References

External links

1974 births
Living people
People from Mansoura, Egypt
Egyptian footballers
Egyptian Premier League players
Egyptian expatriate sportspeople in Turkey
Egypt international footballers
1999 FIFA Confederations Cup players
1998 African Cup of Nations players
2000 African Cup of Nations players
2002 African Cup of Nations players
2004 African Cup of Nations players
2006 Africa Cup of Nations players
2010 Africa Cup of Nations players
El Mansoura SC players
Egyptian expatriate footballers
Gençlerbirliği S.K. footballers
Denizlispor footballers
Konyaspor footballers
Eskişehirspor footballers
Expatriate footballers in Turkey
FIFA Century Club
Süper Lig players
People from Dakahlia Governorate
Africa Cup of Nations-winning players
Naturalized citizens of Turkey
Association football defenders
ENPPI SC players